A bumboat is a small boat used to ferry supplies to ships moored away from the shore.  The name comes from the combination of the Dutch word for a canoe—"boomschuit" ("boom" meaning "tree"), and "boat".

In Tobias Smollett's  1748 novel, The Adventures of Roderick Random, a "bumboat woman" conducts business with sailors imprisoned on board a pressing tender moored near the Tower Wharf on the Thames River, London, England.
In HMS Pinafore, W. S. Gilbert describes Little Buttercup as a Bumboat Woman.

In Singapore, the term "bumboat" is applied to small water taxis and boats that take tourists on short tours.

See also

References

External links

 "The Bumboat Woman's Story"—one of W. S. Gilbert's Bab Ballads (from the Gilbert & Sullivan Archive)
 Singaporean bumboat —photo by Rajit Vijayan

Boat types